James fitz Maurice FitzGerald, 10th Earl of Desmond (died 1529), also counted as the 11th, plotted against King Henry VIII with King Francis I of France in 1523 and with Emperor Charles V in 1528 and 1529.

Birth and origins 
James was born about 1490 in Munster, Ireland, second but only surviving son of Maurice FitzGerald and his first wife Ellen Roche. His father was Earl of Desmond, counted the 9th or the 10th, and called "the Lame", "Vehiculus", and "Bellicosus". His father's family were the FitzGeralds of Desmond, a noble cadet branch of the FitzGeralds or Geraldines, which were Old English descending from Maurice FitzGerald, Lord of Llanstephan, who had come to Ireland with Strongbow in 1169. The FitzGeralds of Kildare were the senior branch of that family.

His mother was a daughter of Maurice Roche, 2nd Lord of Fermoy and his first wife Joan FitzGerald. His mother's family, the Roches also were Old English and descended from Adam de Rupe who had come to Ireland from Wales with Robert FitzStephen.

James had an elder brother Thomas, who was heir apparent but predeceased his father. He also had sisters. All his sisters are listed in his father's article.

Marriage and children 
James married Amy, daughter of Turlough O'Brien, a pre-reformation bishop of Killaloe (died 1525 or 1526), who had not stayed celibate. Her mother's family were the O'Briens of Ara (County Tipperary), a cadet branch of the O'Briens, kings of Thomond.

 
James and Amy had an only daughter:
Joan (Amy) (1509 or 1514 – 1565), married 1st James Butler, 9th Earl of Ormond; 2ndly Francis Bryan, and 3rdly Gerald FitzGerald, 14th Earl of Desmond

James also had two illegitimate half-sisters from his father:
Honora (d. 1577), illegitimate
Ellice, illegitimate

Earldom and feuds with neighbours 
FitzGerald's father seems to have already relied on him in the governing of the earldom in his later years. In 1520 his father died and was buried in the Dominican friary of Tralee, which had been founded in 1243 by his ancestor John fitz Thomas FitzGerald, 1st Baron Desmond. FitzGerald succeeded his father as Earl of Desmond, counted as the 10th or the 11th earl.

In the 1520s Desmond, as he now was, fought his neighbours, the lords of Muskerry in County Cork and the earls of Ormond in eastern Munster. He also quarrelled with his uncle Thomas fitz Thomas FitzGerald, called "the Bald", who sided with his enemies. In September 1521 Desmond was defeated at the Battle of Mourne Abbey, south of Mallow, County Cork, by the allied forces of Cormac Laidir MacCarthy, 9th Lord of Muskerry, and Thomas the Bald.

In December, Muskerry, Thomas the Bald, and Piers Butler, 8th Earl of Ormond, besieged him in Dungarvan.

Francis I of France 
During the Italian War of 1521–1526 that opposed England as an ally of the Habsburgs against France, Desmond conspired in 1522 with King Francis I of France against his liege, King Henry VIII, recognizing Richard de la Pole as king of England and discussing a possible French invasion of Ireland. An attainder against Desmond was drafted in 1522 but never passed parliament.

In 1525 the King sent Gerald FitzGerald, 9th Earl of Kildare, Lord Deputy of Ireland, with an army to arrest Desmond for treason, but Desmond evaded capture.

Charles Quint 
By the Treaty of the More in 1525 Henry VII ended the war with France and then in 1527 by the treaty of Westminster reversed the alliance, now fighting in the War of the League of Cognac (1526–1530) as an ally of France against Charles V. Desmond reacted by also changing sides and allied himself with Emperor Charles V in 1528 and 1529 The Emperor sent his chaplain Gonzalo Fernandez to see Desmond at Dingle. The chaplain reported that the earl was between 30 and 40 years old.

Death and timeline 
Desmond died unexpectedly on 18 June 1529 at Rathkeale or at Dingle. He was buried with his father at Tralee, His death without a male heir provoked a succession crisis. His daughter was heir general but his uncle Thomas, called the Bald, succeeded as 11th Earl of Desmond. His widow married Edmond Fitzmaurice, 9th Baron of Kerry and Lixnaw as his second wife and died in 1537.

Notes and references

Notes

Citations

Sources 

 

  (for Desmond and Fermoy)
 
  – Dacre to Dysart (for Desmond)
  – Eardley of Spalding to Goojerat (for Fermoy)
  – Hussey to Lincolnshire (for Kerry)
 
  – (Preview)
  – (Preview)
 
  – (for timeline)
  – Online abstract
 
 
  – "The bald", earl of Desmond
  – Earliest times to 1568
 
 
 
 

1529 deaths
16th-century Irish people
Earls of Desmond (1329 creation)
James
Norman warriors
Normans in Ireland
People of the Tudor period
Year of birth unknown